Acraea admatha, the Hewitson's glassy acraea, is a butterfly in the family Nymphalidae. It is found in southern Nigeria, Cameroon, Equatorial Guinea, Gabon, the Republic of the Congo, northern Angola and the western part of the Democratic Republic of the Congo.

Description

A. admatha Hew. (53 e). Forewing as far as vein 2 or 3 rose-coloured or brick-red, then smoky and transparent, discal dots 1 b to 5 and a dot in the cell usually more or less distinct, but never sharply prominent; hindwing above with red ground-colour and sharply prominent basal and discal dots and broad black marginal band with large red marginal spots; beneath marked as above but with light, reddish white ground-colour. In the female the red parts of the male are dirty yellowish grey or grey-brown. Sierra Leone to Natal and British East Africa.

Biology
The habitat consists of forest edges, secondary forests and agricultural areas with a full canopy.

The larvae feed on Rinorea species.

Taxonomy
It is a member of the Acraea terpsicore species group -   but see also Pierre & Bernaud, 2014

References

External links

 Images representing  Acraea admatha at Bold
Acraea admatha at Pteron

Butterflies described in 1865
admatha
Butterflies of Africa
Taxa named by William Chapman Hewitson